Aliens in the Wild, Wild West is a 1999 science fiction film directed by George Erschbamer and written by Alon Kaplan.

Plot 
Aliens in the Wild, Wild West takes place in a mid-19th century western town which had been traveled to by two modern day siblings through the means of time travel.

The younger sibling, Tom Johnson (Locke), was an annoyance to his older sister Sara (Pope).  They fought all the time, which is what got them put into the town.  While back in time, Tom finds an alien spaceship in the forest.  He soon finds out that oxygen is poisonous to the cute and fuzzy aliens, and they only breathe sulfur. The cute and fuzzy aliens resemble a cross between E.T. and a hairy Yoda.  The voice of the youngest alien highly resembles Elmo. When the townsmen find the aliens, they try to sell them to a representative of P.T. Barnum.  Tom and Sara see that this is immoral and try to save the alien by getting it back to the ship. The moral shift appears to be out of character for Sara since we were first introduced to her after she was caught joy riding in a stolen car with her punk rocker convict boyfriend.

After the two siblings are successful in their moral crusade, they are transported back into the modern day ghost town from whence they came. Tom and Sara's sour relationship heals as they drive back to their suburban home.

External links

 

1999 films
1999 science fiction films
Canadian science fiction films
English-language Canadian films
English-language Romanian films
1990s English-language films
Romanian science fiction films
1990s Canadian films